3100 may refer to:

In general
 A.D. 3100, a year in the 4th millennium CE
 3100 BC, a year in the 4th millennium BCE
 3100, a number in the 3000 (number) range

Other uses
 3100: Run and Become (film), a 2018 documentary film about runners
 3100 Zimmerman, an asteroid in the Asteroid Belt, the 3100th asteroid registered
 Hawaii Route 3100, a state highway
 Chevrolet 3100, a truck
 Nokia 3100, a cellphone
 Southern Pacific 3100, a diesel-electric locomotive on display at the Southern California Railway Museum

See also

 3100 series (disambiguation) including '3100 class'
 
 310 (disambiguation)